Hugo Wilson (born 1982) is an English artist and sculptor.

Early life
Wilson was born in London. He is the son of Kenneth Wilson and Diana Wilson, of Battersea, London. At the age of 17 he went to Florence, Italy to be trained as a painter at the Charles H. Cecil Studios, from 2000 to 2004, and received a Master's degree from the City and Guilds of London Institute in 2008.

Career
Wilson has had solo shows at Parafin, London; Project B, Milan; Mihai Nicodim Gallery, Los Angeles, and numerous group or two person shows.

Personal life
On 13 September 2014, Wilson married Princess Maria Theresia of Thurn and Taxis, daughter of Johannes, 11th Prince of Thurn and Taxis, and Countess Gloria of Schönburg-Glauchau, at St. Joseph's Church in Tutzing, Germany. Their first daughter Mafalda Beatrix Maria was born August 21, 2015 in London. Their second daughter Maya Romy Alexandra was born September 22, 2017.
He lives and works in London.

References

External links
 

1982 births
English male sculptors
Living people
21st-century English artists
21st-century British sculptors
21st-century English male artists